Stephon Strickland (born September 30, 1990) is an American professional wrestler currently signed to All Elite Wrestling (AEW), where he performs under the ring name Swerve Strickland and is a former AEW World Tag Team Champion (with Keith Lee). He is also known for his time with WWE, where he performed under the ring name Isaiah "Swerve" Scott, where he is a former one-time NXT North American Champion.

As Shane Strickland, he is best known for his work in Maryland Championship Wrestling (MCW) Major League Wrestling (MLW), Evolve Wrestling and Combat Zone Wrestling (CZW), where he is a former MLW World Heavyweight Champion, Evolve Champion and CZW World Heavyweight Champion. He also is well known for his time on Lucha Underground, where he performed under the ring name Killshot. Additionally, he is also a former two-time CZW Wired TV Champion, and PCW Ultra Heavyweight Champion.

Early life 
Strickland was born in Tacoma, Washington. His father was a sergeant first class cook in the United States Army. His father moved the family to Frankfurt, Germany when Strickland was two months old to live on an American military base. Strickland spent the first seven years of his life in Germany. Following their stay there, they then moved to Mount Joy, Pennsylvania, where he attended Donegal High School. At the school he excelled in sports, notably football, basketball and track.

After graduating, Strickland felt the need to "follow in his father's footsteps", enlisting in the United States Army Reserve. To start this career, Strickland went down to South Carolina to start basic training. From there, he went to Augusta, Georgia for advanced individual training. Following that, he was stationed in York, Pennsylvania, to complete his basic training.

Professional wrestling career

Training and early career (2008–2012)
Shane Strickland decided to become a professional wrestler when he was an 18-year-old, one year into his military service. He was serving as a signal communications specialist, a position he went on to hold for eight years. He began training at Ground Xero (Zero) Wrestling Training Academy in August 2008, doing so while still active duty for the military. It did not take long for him to start getting bookings around the Maryland and Pennsylvania areas. He had military commitments in the city of York, Pennsylvania, which forced him to only wrestle in that general area's independent scene in the early years of his career.

Stricklands first appearance for a significant promotion was in September 2011 for the National Wrestling Alliance where he lost to Phil Brown. On March 3, 2012, he defeated Alex Payne in his debut for East Coast Wrestling Association. He would go to debut for World Xtreme Wrestling in a six-man match on September 15, 2012.

Combat Zone Wrestling (2012–2017)
Strickland made his Combat Zone Wrestling (CZW) debut on February 4, 2012 in a dark match. On March 10, 2012, at Aerial Assault, Strickland participated in the main event, a Best Of The Best 11 Qualifying Aerial Assault Elimination Match won by Samuray del Sol. On November 10, 2012, at Night of Infamy 11, Strickland participated in a CZW Wired TV Open Challenge, but was defeated by the champion A. R. Fox. At Best of the Best 12, Strickland participated in the Best of the Best tournament, but he was defeated in the first round by Alex Colon.

On September 14, 2013, at Down with the Sickness, Strickland participated in the main event a Chris Cash Memorial Fatal 4 Way Ladder match for the CZW Wired TV Championship, but the match was won by Colon. At Cage of Death XV, Colon defeated Strickland in a title match. On March 8, 2014, at High Stakes, Strickland defeated the CZW Wired Champion Devon Moore to win the title for the first time. At Best of the Best XIII, Strickland retained the title against Moore in a Ladder match.

Then, Strickland started a feud with Joe Gacy. At Dojo Wars 6, Strickland lost the title against Gacy. However, Strickland regained the title two weeks later at Dojo Wars 7. In October 2014, Strickland participated in the World Triangle Tournament, a tournament held by Westside Xtreme Wrestling, Combat Zone Wrestling and Big Japan Pro-Wrestling. Strickland ended with 3 point in the Block B. Finally, at Cage of Death XVI, Gacy defeated Strickland for the title. After a lengthy absence in which he wrestled for WXW in Germany, Strickland made a one-time appearance in 2015 in a victory over David Starr.

In 2016, Strickland had an acclaimed series of matches with Dezmond Xavier and in the 2017 Best of the Best tournament, he made it to the finals before losing to Dave Crist. In July that same year, he then went on to defeat Gacy, Lio Rush, and Davey Richards in a 4-way to win the CZW World Heavyweight Championship for the first time. He held on to the title until November before losing to Gacy, who then immediately lost the title to Rickey Shane Page. Page then challenged both men to a Cage Of Death match for the title, which Strickland was unsuccessful at winning.

Independent circuit (2012–2019)
On May 5, 2012, Strickland made his debut for Evolve Wrestling, where he teamed with Latin Dragon to defeat DMC and Nate Carter. On August 4, 2018, Strickland defeated Matt Riddle to win the Evolve Championship at Evolve 108. At Evolve 114 he lost the championship to NXT's Fabian Aichner, ending his three-month reign. Strickland wrestled NXT's Kassius Ohno at Evolve 116 on November 10, 2018 in a losing effort. After not appearing for three months, Strickland returned to Evolve at Evolve 121 on February 15, 2019, to face NXT's Adam Cole. He would be defeated by Cole and the following night he would defeat A. R. Fox. He faced JD Drake at Evolve 126 for the WWN Championship in a match he lost.

In 2016, Strickland made his debut in Germany for Westside Xtreme Wrestling (wXw), taking part in the 16 Carat Gold tournament and later their World Tag Team League, which he won alongside David Starr. They beat many established teams such as, Angélico and Jack Evans, Ringkampf (Timothy Thatcher and Walter), Moustache Mountain (Tyler Bate and Trent Seven) and The Leaders of the New School (Marty Scurll and Zack Sabre Jr.). During 2017's WrestleMania 33 three-day weekend, he wrestled seven matches for five different promotions, including four in one day. On August 25, 2018, Strickland appeared at Triplemanía XXVI. He and A. C. H. appeared at that event to represent Major League Wrestling through the MLW and AAA partnership. They were in a Four-way match for the AAA World Cruiserweight Championship. Strickland would fail to capture the championship. On March 23, 2019, Strickland competed for The Crash Lucha Libre in fatal-4-way for The Crash Cruiserweight Championship.

Strickland won the PCW Ultra Light Heavyweight Championship on March 26, 2018. Two months later at their next event he defended against Douglas James with Ricky Steamboat as the guest referee. He finished the year with successful defenses against Dragon Lee, Flip Gordon, Rey Horus and Darby Allin, among others. On December 7, 2018, Strickland defeated Pentagon Jr. for the PCW Ultra Heavyweight Championship, becoming a double champion as he was still holding the Light Heavyweight Championship. He would vacate the Light Heavyweight Championship shortly after, and he defended the Ultra Heavyweight Championship at their A2K19 event on January 18, 2019 against Brian Cage.

On March 9, 2019, Strickland gave a farewell speech at a DEFY Wrestling event, indicating he will soon be signing with a major company. At Wrestle Summit 2019, he appeared as PCW Ultra roster member. At the event he lost his PCW Ultra Heavyweight Championship to Mil Muertes. Following Wrestle Summit, Strickland revealed that on April 6, he will wrestle for Wrestling Revolver at WrestleCon's Pancakes and Piledrivers event. In the match, he teamed with Joe Gacy and Eddie Kingston to face-off against oVe, in what was promoted as his last match on the independent circuit.

Lucha Underground (2014–2018)
Strickland participated in El Rey Network professional wrestling television series Lucha Underground. Strickland became a central character on Lucha Underground, as one of a small group of characters to appear in every season. His friend Ricochet being on the show led to him sending Konnan some of his demo tapes in late 2014. This led to a tryout match with Willie Mack and him later being signed by the company. He portrayed the character of Lt. Jermaine Strickland, a military vet who carries dog tags to honor the memories of his fallen comrades and wrestled under a mask as Killshot. During the first season, he aligned with Big Ryck and Willie Mack and participated in a tournament for the LU Trios Championship, but they were defeated in the finales by the eventual winners Angélico, Son of Havoc and Ivelisse. Following the first season, Strickland asked head writer Chris DeJoseph if he could write some background and story for his character. This led to it having more military elements.

In Season 2, had a feud with Marty Martinez after Marty stole his dog tags after a match between them ended in a no contest. Their feud ended in a Weapon of Mass Destruction match, where Killshot defeated Martinez. After the match, Killshot started a storyline when he received a letter from A. R. Fox, a former brother in arms who Killshot left for dead in battle. They faced each other at Ultima Lucha Tres Part I in a Hell of War match where Killshot won. ESPN called it "one of the most brutal contests to ever be televised in professional wrestling." Two weeks later, The Mack reunited Killshot and Fox and won the Trios Championship. During Season 4, Killshot had a feud with Son of Havoc which culminated at Ultima Lucha Cuatro in a mask vs mask match. After losing the match, Killshot surrendered his mask to Son of Havoc and revealed his identity as Lt. Jermaine Strickland. As he was leaving the temple, he apologized to Dante Fox and asked to be relieved of duty. Being granted permission, Killshot exited the Lucha Underground temple.

Major League Wrestling (2017–2019)
On October 5, 2017, Strickland debuted in the main event of Major League Wrestling's 2017 rebirth show One Shot by defeating Ricochet. On April 12, 2018, Strickland defeated Matt Riddle at one of MLW's first major shows, to win an eight-man tournament and the vacant MLW World Heavyweight Championship. He lost the title to wrestler Low Ki after Strickland had a few successful defenses, with his reign lasting 91 days. Following that he feuded with Sami Callihan, which ended in a street fight won by Strickland. They also participated in a War Games match in September 2018, where Callihan attacked Strickland during his entrance, removing him from the match. This was reportedly done to write him off television if contract negotiations changed.

On episode 32 of MLW's weekly program MLW Fusion, Strickland faced Low Ki in rematch for the Heavyweight title. However, after a distraction, Ki "ripped" out some of Strickland's hair and rolled him up for the win. After the match, Strickland grabbed a microphone and begun a worked shoot towards MLW management turning heel in the process. He mentions owner Court Bauer and blames management for his bad luck as of late. He ends the promo with, "As of right now, I am terminating my contract and I'm.." as his microphone gets cut off. Strickland proceeded to throw trash at the MLW employees that were confronting him, he flips off one of them and hops the rail into the audience and leaves.

They followed this up two weeks later on Fusion with a scene of Strickland and Court Bauer arguing behind his closed office door. After this, it was stated he was "contractly obligated" to appear at the December 13, 2018 MLW event, Never Say Never. At the event he was defeated by CMLL luchador Rush. This match aired on MLW Fusion on January 18, 2019. Strickland opened the show with a heel promo disparaging the fans and the city until he was interrupted by Rush. This would be Strickland's last regular appearance in MLW. On January 15, 2019, Strickland stated on Twitter that he was now a free agent.

Strickland wouldn't return to MLW until the March 31, 2022 Intimidation Games event, appearing as the mystery opponent for Myron Reed's MLW World Middleweight Championship in a losing effort, and aligning himself with Azteca Underground's Cesar Duran, (formally Dario Cueto in Lucha Underground).

WWE (2019–2021) 
On April 17, 2019, it was announced that he signed a contract with WWE and begun working at their Performance Center, and his ring name was changed to Isaiah "Swerve" Scott. He wrestled his debut match against Cameron Grimes, a dark match that took place before the May 1 NXT television tapings. In June, it was announced that Scott will compete in a tournament named NXT Breakout Tournament, where he made his debut on the July 3 episode of NXT, losing to Cameron Grimes in the first round of the tournament. On the July 23 episode of 205 Live, he debuted on the brand by losing to Cruiserweight Champion Drew Gulak. At Worlds Collide on January 25, 2020, Scott challenged for the Cruiserweight Championship in a fatal four way match against Travis Banks, Jordan Devlin, and then-champion Angel Garza, but was unsuccessful.

On April 12, Scott was announced as a participant in a tournament to determine the interim NXT Cruiserweight Champion, representing Group B in the tournament, where he was defeated by Akira Tozawa and Gentleman Jack Gallagher, but was able to defeat El Hijo del Fantasma, leaving him with one win in the tournament, thus failing to advance to the finals. Scott then began feuding with Cruiserweight Champion Santos Escobar, El Hijo del Fantasma's new ring name, after Scott claimed to be the only one who has pinned Escobar. On the August 26 episode of NXT, Scott challenged Escobar for the title but lost after Escobar hit him with a loaded mask. On the September 1 episode of NXT Super Tuesday, Scott and Breezango (Tyler Breeze and Fandango) defeated Legado del Fantasma in a Six-Man Street Fight after Scott once again pinned Escobar, thus earning Scott a title shot at NXT TakeOver: 31. At the event, he lost to Escobar.

Scott then entered the Dusty Rhodes Tag Team Classic tournament, where he was paired with Jake Atlas, but the two were eliminated from the tournament by the eventual winner MSK (Nash Carter and Wes Lee) and following the match, argued with one another. On the February 17, 2021 episode of NXT, Scott attacked Leon Ruff after losing a match to him, turning heel in the process. At NXT Takeover: Stand & Deliver, Scott would participated in a 6 Way match, where he eliminated Ruff and Cameron Grimes but would be last person eliminated in the match by Bronson Reed. 

On the May 4 episode of NXT, Scott defeated Ruff in a Falls Count Anywhere match after A. J. Francis interfered on Scott's behalf. The following week, Scott was joined by Francis (who was now called Top Dolla), 
Tehuti Miles (now called Ashante "Thee" Adonis) and Briana Brandy (now B-FAB), forming the stable Hit Row. On the June 29 episode of NXT, Scott defeated Bronson Reed to win the NXT North American Championship, his first title in his WWE career. As part of the 2021 Draft, Scott along with the rest of Hit Row, were drafted to the SmackDown brand. On the October 12 episode of NXT, he defeated Santos Escobar to retain his NXT North American championship, only to lose to Carmelo Hayes, ending his 105-day reign. On November 4, B-Fab was released from her WWE contract, shortening the group. On November 18, Scott was released from his WWE contract along with Adonis and Dolla.

All Elite Wrestling (2022–present)
After departing from WWE, Strickland, now using the name Swerve Strickland, signed with All Elite Wrestling on March 6, 2022, at the Revolution pay-per-view event.
He made his in-ring debut for AEW on the March 11 episode of AEW Rampage, scoring a pinfall victory over Tony Nese. The following week, Strickland aligned himself with Keith Lee in a feud with Team Taz (Powerhouse Hobbs and Ricky Starks). Strickland and Lee would then begin tag teaming, dubbing themselves Swerve In Our Glory. At Dynamite: Fyter Fest Night 1 on July 13, Swerve In Our Glory defeated defending champions The Young Bucks and Team Taz in a Triple or Nothing match to win the AEW World Tag Team Championship. They had successful title defenses against the likes of The Lucha Brothers and the Gunn Club (Colten & Austin Gunn). They would then enter a three match series with The Acclaimed (Max Caster & Anthony Bowens), defeating them at All Out, losing the belts to them in a rematch at Dynamite: Grand Slam, and losing to them once more at Full Gear after Strickland slapped Lee when Lee refused to use a pair of pliers as a weapon, causing Lee to walk out on the match. On the December 21 edition of on Dynamite, Strickland formed a new stable, Mogul Affiliates, with Parker Boudreaux, Granden Goetzman (Later named Trench), and famed rapper Rick Ross. Strickland, Boudreaux, and Goetzman all attacked Lee, effectively ending the Swerve In Our Glory team, laying him out on the steel ring stairs with Strickland delivering his Swerve Stomp finishing move through a cinder block on Lee's chest, turning heel in the process.

Personal life 
He has two daughters and a son, that were all born in the early 2010s. Strickland is the first cousin of former NFL linebacker Fred Strickland.

Other media 
As Isaiah "Swerve" Scott, he made his video game debut in WWE 2K22.

Championships and accomplishments

All Elite Wrestling
AEW World Tag Team Championship (1 time) - with Keith Lee
Combat Zone Wrestling
CZW World Heavyweight Championship (1 time)
CZW Wired TV Championship (2 times)
DEFY Wrestling
DEFY World Championship (3 times, current)
Defy Tag Team Championship (1 time) - with Christopher Daniels
Interim Defy World Championship (1 time, current)
Evolve
Evolve Championship (1 time)
Ground Xero Wrestling
GXW Respect Championship (1 time)
Lucha Underground
Lucha Underground Trios Championship (2 times) – with A. R. Fox and Willie Mack (1) and The Mack and Son of Havoc (1)
Major League Wrestling
MLW World Heavyweight Championship (1 time)
MLW World Heavyweight Title Tournament (2018)
Next Generation Wrestling
NGW Championship (1 time)
PCW Ultra
PCW Ultra Heavyweight Championship (1 time)
PCW Ultralight Championship (1 time)
Pro Wrestling Illustrated
Ranked No. 185 of the top 500 singles wrestlers in the PWI 500 in 2021
Vicious Outcast Wrestling 
VOW Hyper Sonic Championship (1 time)
Westside Xtreme Wrestling
wXw World Tag Team Championship (1 time) – with David Starr
World Tag Team League (2016) – with David Starr
WrestleCircus
WrestleCircus Ringmaster Championship (1 time)
WWE
NXT North American Championship (1 time)

Luchas de Apuestas record

References

External links

 

1990 births
Living people
AEW World Tag Team Champions
All Elite Wrestling personnel
American male professional wrestlers
Sportspeople from Tacoma, Washington
Masked wrestlers
Professional wrestlers from Washington (state)
African-American male professional wrestlers
NXT North American Champions
21st-century African-American sportspeople
21st-century professional wrestlers
CZW World Heavyweight Champions
CZW Wired Champions
MLW World Heavyweight Champions